El Enemigo, Spanish for "The Enemy", may refer to:

El Enemigo (1961 telenovela), a Mexican telenovela
El Enemigo (1979 telenovela), a remake of the 1961 telenovela

See also
Enemy (disambiguation)
Los Enemigos (disambiguation)